Wang Tong may refer to:

Wang Tong (basketball) (born 1995), Chinese player
Wang Tong (philosopher) (584–617), Chinese official, writer and Confucian philosopher of the Sui dynasty
Wang Tong (footballer, born 1993)
Wang Tong (footballer, born 1997)